Szukalski (feminine: Szukalska) is a Polish-language surname. Notable people with this surname include:

 Albert Szukalski (1945–2000), Polish-Belgian sculptor
 Stanisław Szukalski (1893–1987), a Polish painter and sculptor
 Tomasz Szukalski (1947–2012), a Polish jazz saxophone player

See also 
 Asteroid 12259 Szukalski, named after Albert Szukalski

Polish-language surnames